William H. Johnson (November 21, 1895 – October 26, 1988), nicknamed "Sampson", was an American Negro league catcher in the 1920s.

A native of Sparta, Georgia, Johnson attended Morris Brown College. He made his Negro leagues debut in 1920 with the Dayton Marcos. Johnson went on to play for several teams, including the Washington/Wilmington Potomacs and the Hilldale Club, finishing his career in 1928 with the Philadelphia Tigers and Brooklyn Royal Giants. He died in New York, New York in 1988 at age 92.

References

External links
 and Baseball-Reference Black Baseball stats and Seamheads

1895 births
1988 deaths
Brooklyn Royal Giants players
Dayton Marcos players
Harrisburg Giants players
Hilldale Club players
Philadelphia Tigers players
Washington Potomacs players
Wilmington Potomacs players
Baseball catchers
Baseball players from Georgia (U.S. state)
People from Sparta, Georgia
20th-century African-American sportspeople